Cleonis is a genus of cylindrical weevils in the beetle family Curculionidae. There are at least 120 described species in Cleonis.

See also
 List of Cleonis species

References

Further reading

External links

 

Lixinae
Articles created by Qbugbot